Lasse Kopitz (born May 21, 1980) is a German former professional ice hockey defenceman. He most notably played for the Iserlohn Roosters in the Deutsche Eishockey Liga (DEL).

Career statistics

Regular season and playoffs

International

References

External links

1980 births
Living people
Frankfurt Lions players
Füchse Duisburg players
German ice hockey defencemen
Ice hockey players at the 2006 Winter Olympics
Olympic ice hockey players of Germany
Iserlohn Roosters players
Kölner Haie players
Krefeld Pinguine players
Revier Löwen players
Thomas Sabo Ice Tigers players